Boniface Mucheru Tumuti (born 2 May 1992) is a Kenyan sprinter and hurdler. He competed in the 400 metres hurdles at the 2012 and 2016 Olympics and won a silver medal in 2016.

Competition record

References

1992 births
Living people
People from Laikipia County
Kenyan male hurdlers
Olympic athletes of Kenya
Athletes (track and field) at the 2012 Summer Olympics
Athletes (track and field) at the 2016 Summer Olympics
Commonwealth Games competitors for Kenya
Athletes (track and field) at the 2014 Commonwealth Games
World Athletics Championships athletes for Kenya
Olympic silver medalists in athletics (track and field)
Medalists at the 2016 Summer Olympics
Olympic silver medalists for Kenya
IAAF Continental Cup winners